Rice–Eccles Stadium is an outdoor college football stadium located on the campus of the University of Utah in Salt Lake City, Utah. It is the home field of the Utah Utes of the Pac-12 Conference. It served as the main stadium for the 2002 Winter Olympics; the Opening and Closing Ceremonies were held at the stadium, which was temporarily renamed "Rice–Eccles Olympic Stadium".

History 
When Salt Lake City was awarded the 2002 Winter Olympics in June 1995, it was obvious that Rice Stadium, the largest outdoor stadium in Salt Lake City, was not suitable to serve as the main stadium. The concrete, timber, and earth-fill facility was built in 1927 and had not aged well. In 1996, U of U athletic director Chris Hill announced plans to renovate Rice Stadium into a new facility that would be up to Olympic standards. It was initially expected to take three years to completely overhaul the facility.

However, in 1997, Spencer Eccles, a Utah alumnus and chairman of Utah's biggest bank, First Security Corporation (now part of Wells Fargo), announced that the George S. and Dolores Dore Eccles Foundation would donate $10 million toward the project.

Renovations 
Immediately after the 1997 season's final home game on November 15, fittingly a 31–14 victory over Rice, Rice Stadium was almost completely demolished, replaced with a modern steel, concrete and glass facility.  All that remained of the old stadium were the stands in the south end zone, built in 1982. The stadium did not miss a football season, as the project was timed not to disrupt the 1997 home schedule. The new stadium was ready less than 10 months later for the 1998 home opener, a 45–22 win over Louisville on September 12. The stadium now seats 45,807 and has a six-story press box.

As of 2014, a row of bleachers has been added in the standing room areas on the east, west and north sections of Rice–Eccles Stadium. 40 ADA seats were also added for a total of 790 new seats, bringing the capacity of Rice–Eccles Stadium to 45,807 (from 45,017). There will still be space for standing room behind the new row of bleachers.

In June 2010, the U of U accepted an invitation to join the Pacific-10 Conference (which changed its name to the Pac-12 Conference shortly after the Utah Utes and the Colorado Buffaloes joined) and began playing in the conference during 2011–2012 season. It is expected that Rice–Eccles Stadium is to be expanded and the locker room facilities upgraded. This claim was furthered when both KSL.com and the Deseret News reported that the university was seriously considering expanding the stadium by at least 10,000 seats, which brings the expected capacity to 51,444.

It was announced in 2019 to demolish the South End Zone and rebuild to add 6,000 more seats, high-end suites, locker rooms, offices, terrace seating, and a restaurant for $80 million; a major donor was the Kendall Garff Family of ($17.5 million) and the area was named after him (Ken Garff Red Zone). Construction on the South End Zone was completed on 12 Aug 2021 and opened to the public. The total seat increase was 5,637 when construction was completed.

The Ken Garff Red Zone features new home and visiting locker rooms, sports medicine facilities and hospitality areas, the University Club restaurant, Diglisic Lounge, Layton Field Club, and various premium seating options, including suites, loge boxes, ledge, club, and premium terrace seating as well as additional bleacher seating. Utah’s new locker room is 5,300 square feet with 90 lockers. It features a one-of-a-kind locker design with hidden storage, wireless charging, and a locking box for athletes.

Features

Olympic Cauldron Park 

Immediately south of the stadium was the Salt Lake 2002 Olympic Cauldron Park, which contained a 2002 Winter Olympic museum, the Olympic cauldron, and other memorabilia from the games. Only the cauldron remains at the stadium today; the museum and other memorabilia have all since been removed. Hoberman Arch was located until its removal in October 2014. The cauldron has undergone refurbishment and was relocated to a new Olympic plaza at the Southwest corner outside the stadium, just west of the South Endzone expansion.

Playing surface 
Since 2002, the playing field at Rice–Eccles Stadium has been FieldTurf, a next-generation infilled synthetic turf, which was most recently replaced in 2015.

When the stadium reopened in 1998, its surface was SportGrass, a hybrid of natural grass and artificial turf. Earlier, Rice Stadium had been among the first facilities to use SportGrass.  A full natural grass was installed in 2000 for two seasons, then was covered by asphalt blacktop for the Opening and Closing Ceremonies of the 2002 Winter Olympics in February.

Events

2002 Winter Olympics and Paralympics 

During the 2002 Winter Olympics, the stadium served as the venue for the Opening Ceremony on February 8, 2002, and for the Closing Ceremony on February 24, 2002. To host the ceremonies, the grass field was paved over with asphalt and a stage was constructed, scoreboards were removed, flags and Olympic livery were installed, temporary seating was brought in (allowing more than 50,000 spectators), and the 2002 Olympic cauldron was installed atop the southern bleachers.

For the duration of the games, the stadium was temporarily renamed the Rice–Eccles Olympic Stadium. Through broadcasts from the stadium, an estimated 3.5 billion people worldwide watched the Opening and Closing Ceremonies on television.

The Opening Ceremony of the 2002 Winter Paralympics was also held in the stadium on March 7, 2002. The corresponding Closing Ceremony followed suit on March 16, 2002.

Concerts

Real Salt Lake 
Rice–Eccles Stadium was also the home field of the Major League Soccer franchise Real Salt Lake from 2005 until October 2008, when Rio Tinto Stadium was opened in the suburb of Sandy, south of Salt Lake City.

Utah Utes 
Rice–Eccles Stadium replaced Rice Stadium, the former home field of the Utah Utes football team. The first Utes game at the stadium was a 45–22 victory over the Louisville Cardinals held on September 12, 1998, with 44,112 in attendance. The Utes had a 53–16 record at the stadium through the 2009  season.

Salt Lake Stallions 
The Salt Lake Stallions of the Alliance of American Football (AAF) played at Rice–Eccles Stadium during the league's lone season in 2019.

Other events 
The stadium hosted a round of the AMA Supercross Championship from 2001 to 2004, 2009 to 2013 and 2017.  In 2020, it hosted the final seven rounds of the series. Since 2021, Rice-Eccles Stadium has been the home of the Championship round

Rice-Eccles Stadium had its inaugural Monster Jam event on April 30, 2022 and is set to host again on May 6, 2023.

Gallery

Attendance records

See also 
 List of NCAA Division I FBS football stadiums

References

External links

 

College football venues
Former Major League Soccer stadiums
Real Salt Lake
Soccer venues in Utah
Sports venues in Salt Lake City
American football venues in Utah
Utah Utes football venues
Venues of the 2002 Winter Olympics
Olympic stadiums
Sports venues completed in 1998
1998 establishments in Utah
Defunct National Premier Soccer League stadiums
Salt Lake Stallions